The Allaire Iron Works was a leading 19th-century American marine engineering company based in New York City. Founded in 1816 by engineer and philanthropist James P. Allaire, the Allaire Works was one of the world's first companies dedicated to the construction of marine steam engines, supplying the engines for more than 50% of all the early steamships built in the United States.

James P. Allaire retired from the company in 1850 when it was taken over by Cornelius Vanderbilt. During Vanderbilt's ownership, the Allaire Iron Works made a significant contribution to the Union cause during the American Civil War. Following the war, the Allaire Works, like many other American marine engineering companies, fell on hard times, and in 1869 it was wound up, whereupon its equipment was purchased by John Roach, who also hired its best employees for his own company, the Morgan Iron Works.

Amongst the many notable achievements of the Allaire Works, it supplied the engine cylinder for the first steamship to cross the Atlantic, Savannah, pioneered the use of the compound engine in steamships, and built the engines for two winners of the coveted Blue Riband. The company also supplied the engines for at least 17 U.S. Navy warships during the American Civil War.

Background

James Peter Allaire founded his first company, a brass foundry, at 466 Cherry Street, New York, in 1804. In 1807, Allaire received an order from steamboat pioneer Robert Fulton for brass fittings for the North River Steamboat, the world's first commercially successful steam-powered vessel. Allaire and Fulton struck up a friendship, and Allaire provided fittings for later vessels built by Fulton.

Following Fulton's death in 1815, Allaire leased his plant and equipment from the Fulton and Livingstone families, and entered a partnership with Fulton's chief engineer, Charles Stoudinger. Allaire and Stoudinger built the engine and boiler for the last steamboat contracted for by the Fulton shop, the Chancellor Livingstone, which was completed about a year later.

Stoudinger himself died shortly after completion of Chancellor Livingstone, after which Allaire decided to move Fulton's equipment from its location in New Jersey to his brassworks at Cherry St., New York. With the consolidation of his business at the Cherry St. plant, Allaire renamed it the Allaire Iron Works.

Allaire ownership, 1816-1850

Early period, 1816-1822

In 1817, the Allaire Iron Works supplied the engine cylinder for Savannah, the first steamship to make a transatlantic crossing. The cylinder, one of the largest then built, had a diameter of 40 inches, while the piston had a stroke of 5 feet. Savannah was not a commercial success, and following her return voyage from Europe, her engine was removed and sold to Allaire.

In 1819, the Allaire Works supplied the engine for Robert Fulton, the first steamship to enter service along the United States coastline (as opposed to working the inland waterways). This engine had a  cylinder and a stroke of 5 feet. Robert Fulton helped to demonstrate that steamships were capable of reliable seagoing service. Other engines built in this period by the Allaire Works include those for United States—a 140-foot steamer said to be the first American steamboat to issue tickets (rather than "way-bills") to passengers—and for James Kent, North Carolina, South Carolina and other Hudson River steamers.

Howell Works

As Allaire's business grew, he found it increasingly difficult to source adequate amounts of quality pig iron from which to manufacture his engines. The best quality pig iron was imported from Britain, but high tariffs made it uneconomic to use. The pig iron industry in the United States was at this time still in its infancy, and producing neither the quality nor quantity of pig iron required.

The only solution was for Allaire to become a manufacturer of pig iron himself. In 1822, in response to a recommendation from a friend, Allaire purchased  of land in Monmouth County, New Jersey, which contained a furnace used for manufacturing pig iron from the natural resource of bog iron. Allaire renamed the furnace the Howell Works, and over the next 20 years used it to source most of his pig iron, during which time Howell Works grew to be a substantial and largely self-sufficient community, complete with its own church, school, company store and farmland.

Pioneering compound engines, 1820s

In 1824, the Allaire Works built the engine for the steamboat , the first steam vessel in the world fitted with a compound engine. The high-pressure cylinder was 12 inches in diameter and the low-pressure cylinder 24 inches, with both having a stroke of 4 feet. In the same year, the Allaire Works also supplied a compound engine for a 200-ton towboat called Post Boy, and another for a small steamer, Linnaeus.

Other vessels equipped with compound engines from the Allaire Works to 1828 included Sun, Commerce, Swiftsure and Pilot Boy. The Allaire Works built compound engines decades before the advantages of such engines became widely recognized in the shipbuilding industry.

Growth and financial problems, 1830s-1850
 
In the 1830s, the Allaire business empire reached the peak of its expansion. The Howell Works in New Jersey was producing a surplus of pig iron, enabling Allaire to diversify into the manufacture of household goods in addition to his production of marine engines in New York. Ships supplied with Allaire-built engines in this period included Frank, New Haven, Rhode Island and Massachusetts. Massachusetts, then the largest ship operating on Long Island Sound, was driven by a pair of beam engines.

Allaire had also accumulated considerable interest in steamships by this time. In 1836, a ship in which Allaire was part-owner, William Gibbons, ran aground and was destroyed. In the same year, the Howell Works furnace blew out and production there temporarily ceased. The following year, the Panic of 1837 plunged America into a severe recession, and later that year, the steamboat Home, wholly owned by Allaire and largely uninsured, sank with the loss of 100 lives, damaging Allaire's reputation and leaving him short of capital.

Allaire had up until this point in his career been able to borrow to meet cash shortfalls, but with the recession affecting demand for his products, he was obliged to look elsewhere for working capital. In 1842, he sold shares in the Allaire Iron Works, which was incorporated for the sum of $300,000. Shipping magnate Cornelius Vanderbilt and Allaire's brother-in-law John Haggerty were thus able to eventually gain a controlling interest in the company.

With the capital infusion from incorporation, the Allaire Iron Works remained productive through the 1840s. In this period, engines were supplied for steamboats such as Isaac Newton in 1846, C. Vanderbilt in 1847, and Commodore in 1848 (the names for the latter two reflecting Vanderbilt's growing influence in the company). Engines were also supplied for the sister ships Bay State and Empire State in 1846–47, the former of which was the fastest boat on Long Island Sound for some years. The engines for these two vessels were of the side-lever type, with Pacific having a 95-inch cylinder and 9-foot stroke, and Baltic a 96-inch cylinder and 10 foot stroke. Both ships were to become Blue Riband winners by setting speed records for transatlantic crossings.

Vanderbilt ownership, 1850-1869

Vanderbilt takeover

In 1850, James P. Allaire retired from the Presidency of the Allaire Iron Works—according to one report, through the machinations of his brother-in-law John Haggerty, who may have been scandalized by the former's marriage to a young woman 26 years his junior in 1846. Cornelius Vanderbilt subsequently gained control of the company, appointing T. F. Secor, former proprietor of T. F. Secor & Co., as its manager.

After the Vanderbilt takeover, an increasing percentage of the company's contracts came from Vanderbilt himself, who from this point had most of his new steamboats and steamships engined there, just as most of his shipbuilding contracts went to the same firm, that of his trusted nephew, Jeremiah Simonson. Vanderbilt brought his own ideas to the field of marine steam engineering. Defying the prevailing wisdom, he began powering oceangoing steamships with American walking beam engines, believing that their relative lightness of construction, economy of operation and low maintenance requirements made them preferable to the low center-of-gravity, but more complex, British-designed side-lever and oscillating types. Other American marine engine manufacturers quickly followed his example, and walking beams became the preferred engine type for oceangoing American sidewheel steamships until the introduction of the much more economical surface condensing compound engine in the early 1870s.

During the 1850s, the Allaire Works supplied engines to such notable ships as Buckeye State in 1850—only the second ship on the Great Lakes to be fitted with a compound engine—and the 3,360-ton Vanderbilt, whose twin 90-inch cylinder beam engines were believed to make her the fastest oceangoing ship operating from New York upon launch in 1856. Other ships fitted with Allaire powerplants in this period include North Star (1853), a transatlantic ocean liner, St. Lawrence (1853), built for operation on the Great Lakes, and the Long Island Sound steamer Plymouth Rock (1854).

American Civil War

The Allaire Iron Works made a substantial contribution to the Union cause during the American Civil War, providing the engines for at least seven warships, while at least another ten merchant ships with Allaire engines were purchased or chartered by the U.S. Navy and converted into warships.

In 1864, the Allaire Works supplied two 100-inch cylinder, 4-foot stroke vibrating-lever engines for the 4,912-ton monitor ; however delays in supply of the ship's 20-inch Dahlgren smoothbore cannon prevented the vessel from seeing wartime service.

The Allaire Works also supplied the engines in 1864 for the 4,215-ton Wampanoag class screw sloop . Intended to be a very fast ship, Madawaska was fitted with experimental vibrating-lever engines designed by Navy architect John Ericsson. The engines proved a failure, delivering a cruising speed of only 12.73 knots, well under the specified speed of 15 knots, and they were later replaced with a more conventional power plant.

In addition to the engines directly contracted for, the Navy also requisitioned a number of merchant steamships powered by Allaire engines and converted them into warships. Some of these vessels had been built prior to the war, while others were built during the war and requisitioned by the Navy as they entered service.

The largest and most impressive of these ships was the 3,360-ton oceangoing sidewheel steamer Vanderbilt, launched in 1856, and gifted to the U.S. Navy by Cornelius Vanderbilt in 1862. With her 14 knot speed and long operational range, Vanderbilt was an ideal candidate for a pursuit ship, and after being fitted out with a formidable battery of cannon, the newly commissioned  was employed in a year-long hunt for the notorious Confederate raider CSS Alabama, but without success.

The Allaire Works also continued to produce engines for commercial vessels during the conflict, such as City of New London, built in 1863, and St. John, which was built in 1864 and used as a hospital ship.

Postwar slump and closure

Shortly after the end of hostilities, the U.S. government dumped more than a million tons of unwanted shipping onto the market, driving down prices and depriving the shipbuilding industry of new orders. The slump lasted several years, and many ship and marine engine builders were driven to bankruptcy in this period.

By 1867, the Allaire Iron Works had only one engine and one boiler on its books. The company soldiered on until 1869 when Cornelius Vanderbilt sold its plant and equipment at auction, which were bought by John Roach at scrap metal prices. Vanderbilt was wealthy enough to survive the slump, but had apparently decided to move his assets into railroads by this time. After the auction, the property of the Allaire Works was divided into a tombstone factory and horse stables.

Roach, one of the few marine entrepreneurs to survive and prosper in the postwar period, took the best of the Allaire Works tools, along with its best former workers, and employed them at his newly acquired plant on the East River, the Morgan Iron Works.

Production, 1816-1867

Merchant ships

The following table lists merchant ships with engines supplied by the Allaire Iron Works from the company's inception in 1816 until its closure in 1867. Names in small print preceded or followed by an arrow in the "Name" column indicate that the engine either originated from or was later installed in the ship so named. This is an incomplete list.

 
Legend: Built=year built; Ton.=gross tonnage; Deployment=original location of operation. Where the original deployment is not known, the location is followed by a number, which represents the last two digits of the year in which the vessel is known to have operated at the given location; No.=number of engines; Cyl.=diameter of engine cylinder(s) in inches; Str.=engine stroke in feet; Type=engine type. Types of engine include: AC=annular compound; B=beam; C=compound; CB=compound beam; C=crosshead. Crosshead engines built by this company are almost certainly all of the American "square" type, rather than the Steeple type; DA=direct-acting; DS=double screw; GS=geared screw; HBA=horizontal back-acting; I=inclined; O=oscillating; S=screw; St=steeple; SL=side-lever; V=vertical;  VB=vertical beam; VL=vibrating-lever.

Warships

The following table lists warships powered by Allaire Iron Works engines. This list is confined to vessels that were designed and built as warships, and does not include merchant ships commissioned into the Navy.

 
<small>Legend: Type=ship type. Types include - G=gunboat; SS=screw sloop; DEG=double-ended gunboat; M=monitor; SF=screw frigate. Built=Year of ship launch, or completion where launch date is unknown; Builder=Name of ship builder; Disp.=displacement in tons; No.=number of engines; Cyl.=diameter of engine cylinder(s) in inches; Str.=engine stroke in feet; Type=engine type. Types of engine include: DA=direct acting; DS=double screw; HBA=horizontal back-acting; I=inverted; S=screw; VL=vibrating-lever. See marine steam engine for explanation of various engine types. </small>

See also
 Marine steam engine

 Footnotes  

References

Citations

Bibliography

Bauer, Karl Jack and Roberts, Stephen S. (1991): Register of Ships of the U.S. Navy, 1775-1990: Major Combatants, Greenwood Publishing Group, .
 Baughman, James P. (1968): Charles Morgan and the Development of Southern Transportation, pp. 242-245, Vanderbilt University Press. 
 Emmons, Lieut. George F., USN (1853): The Navy Of The United States, From The Commencement, 1775 To 1853, Gideon & Co., Washington.
Dayton, Fred Erving (1925): Steamboat Days, Frederick A. Stokes Company, New York, reproduced in part  here.
 Frazer, John F. (ed.) (1859): Journal of the Franklin Institute, pp. 62, 345-46, 3rd Series, Volume 38, Whole No. Volume 68, Franklin Institute, Philadelphia. 
 Frazer, John F. (ed.) (1861): Journal of the Franklin Institute, Volume 71, Franklin Institute, Philadelphia.
 Heyl, Erik (1953–67): Early American Steamers, Volumes 1-5, Erik Heyl, Buffalo, New York.
 Main, Thomas (1893): The Progress of Marine Engineering, From the time of Watt until the present day, The Trade Publishing Co., New York.
Morrison, John Harrison: History Of American Steam Navigation reprinted in 2008 by READ BOOKS, .
 Morrison, John Harrison (1909): History of New York Shipyards, Wm. F. Sametz & Co., New York. 
 
 Stanton, Samuel Ward (1859): American Steam Vessels, Smith & Stanton, New York.
Swann, Leonard Alexander Jr. (1965): John Roach, Maritime Entrepreneur: the Years as Naval Contractor 1862–1886'' — United States Naval Institute (reprinted 1980 by Ayer Publishing).
 U.S. Treasury Department (1838): "Steam Engines", Document No. 21, U.S. Treasury Department.

American companies established in 1816
Defunct marine engineering companies of New York City
1816 establishments in New York (state)